AB Aviation Flight 1103 was a flight operated by a Cessna 208D Grand Caravan from Prince Said Ibrahim International Airport to Mohéli Bandar Es Eslam Airport in the Comoros.

Aircraft 
The aircraft involved in the incident was a Cessna 208D Grand Caravan (registration 5H-MZA) and its first flight was in 2016. The aircraft was equipped with one turboprop Pratt & Whitney Canada PT6A-140 engine.

Passengers and crew 

The nationalities of the occupants were:

References 

2022 in the Comoros
Aviation accidents and incidents in the Comoros
Accidents and incidents by airline of Africa
February 2022 events in Africa
Accidents and incidents involving the Cessna 208 Caravan
Aviation accidents and incidents in 2022
Aviation accidents and incidents in the Indian Ocean
2022 disasters in Africa